In Greek mythology, Tereis was one of the names given for the slave who was the mother, by Menelaus, of Megapenthes. According to R. L. Fowler, the name Tereis occurs nowhere else, may be associated with Thrace, and is possibly corrupt.

Sources
Homer's Odyssey, and the geographer Pausanias, mention that Megapenthes was the illegitimate son of Menelaus, king of Mycenaean Sparta, by a slave, without naming her. But according to one source, the sixth-century BC mythographer Acusilaus (as reported by the mythographer Apollodorus), the name of the slave  was Tereis. Other sources give other names for the slave who bore Megapenthes. For example Apollodorus, in the same passage in which he mentions Tereis, also mentions "Pieris, an Aetolian".

Notes

References
 Apollodorus, Apollodorus, The Library, with an English Translation by Sir James George Frazer, F.B.A., F.R.S. in 2 Volumes. Cambridge, Massachusetts, Harvard University Press; London, William Heinemann Ltd. 1921. . Online version at the Perseus Digital Library.
 Fowler, R. L. (2000), Early Greek Mythography: Volume 1: Text and Introduction, Oxford University Press, 2000. .
 Fowler, R. L. (2013), Early Greek Mythography: Volume 2: Commentary, Oxford University Press, 2013. .
 Grimal, Pierre, The Dictionary of Classical Mythology, Wiley-Blackwell, 1996. .
 Homer, The Odyssey with an English Translation by A.T. Murray, PH.D. in two volumes. Cambridge, Massachusetts, Harvard University Press; London, William Heinemann, Ltd. 1919. Online version at the Perseus Digital Library.
 Pausanias, Pausanias Description of Greece with an English Translation by W.H.S. Jones, Litt.D., and H.A. Ormerod, M.A., in 4 Volumes. Cambridge, Massachusetts, Harvard University Press; London, William Heinemann Ltd. 1918. Online version at the Perseus Digital Library.
 Tripp, Edward, Crowell's Handbook of Classical Mythology, Thomas Y. Crowell Co; First edition (June 1970). .

 Women in Greek mythology